"Watch Out for This (Bumaye)" is a song performed by American electronic music group  Major Lazer from their album Free the Universe. It features vocals from Jamaican singer Busy Signal and Dutch producers The Flexican and FS Green and was released on Diplo's Mad Decent label and the French Because Music label.

The song is a vocal version of the song "Bumaye" by The Flexican and FS Green, from The Flexican's 2011 release Yours Truly: The Mixtape Part II, which itself is a redux of the 2005 song of the same name originally by The Flexican and Typhoon. "Bumaye", as well as "Watch Out for This (Bumaye)", contains a sample of the song "María Lionza" by Willie Colón and Rubén Blades from their 1978 album Siembra and "Carnaval de Arequipa", written by the author Benigno Ballón Farfán from Perú. A remix version of the song features Puerto Rican reggaeton singer Daddy Yankee.

A remix EP was released for free in June 2013, featuring a variety of remixes and cover versions. Later, a remix by Flinch and a VIP remix by Ape Drums and 2Deep were both released for free.

The song was featured in trailers for French film Qu'est-ce qu'on a fait au Bon Dieu?, and was certified platinum in France by the UPFI in 2013.

Music video
The music video was filmed in Kingston, Jamaica by Jay Will (Game Over). It features various dancers performing typically Caribbean dance styles as well as wining. It also shows Busy Signal performing.

Track listing

Chart performance

Weekly charts

Year-end charts

Certifications

References

External links
 Watch out for this - The Original from Jorge Huirse

2013 singles
2013 songs
Major Lazer songs
Moombahton songs
Reggae fusion songs
Songs written by Diplo
Songs written by Rubén Blades